The 150th Special Operations Wing (150 SOW) is a unit of the New Mexico Air National Guard, stationed at Kirtland Air Force Base. The wing traces its history back to the expansion of the 150th Tactical Fighter Group into the 150th Fighter Wing in 1995. In 2013, the Wing combined with the 58th Special Operations Wing to become the 150th Special Operations Wing, tasked with providing training for Air Force Special Operations Command units.

History 

The 150th Tactical Fighter Group was constituted in 1957.

The group began converting from the A-7D Corsair II to the F-16 Fighting Falcon at the beginning of the 1990s. On 16March 1992, the 150th Tactical Fighter Group was redesignated as the 150th Fighter Group. Its last A-7 was flown from Kirtland to Davis–Monthan Air Force Base for decommissioning on 28September.

In October 1995 the 150th Tactical Fighter Group was expanded into the 150th Fighter Wing. On 1December 2013 the 150th Fighter Wing was re-designated as the 150th Special Operations Wing and integrated with the 58th Special Operations Wing. The wing assumed the mission of special operations training.

Lineage 
 Constituted as 150th Fighter Group (Air Defense) and allotted to New Mexico ANG, 1957
 Received federal recognition and activated on 1 July 1957
 Re-designated: 150th Tactical Fighter Group, 1 April 1964
 In non-operational status, 26 January 19684 June 1969
 Re-designated: 150th Fighter Group, 16 March 1992
 Status changed from Group to Wing, 1 October 1995
 Re-designated: 150th Fighter Wing, 1 October 1995
 Re-designated: 150th Special Operations Wing, 1 December 2013

Components

Groups 
 150th Maintenance Group
 150th Operations Group
 150th Mission Support Group
 150th Medical Group

Squadrons 
 188th Rescue Squadron
 250th Intelligence Squadron, 2013 – present
 210th RED HORSE Squadron, 2013 – present

References

Further reading 
 A Handbook of Aerospace Defense Organization 1946 – 1980, by Lloyd H. Cornett and Mildred W. Johnson, Office of History, Aerospace Defense Center, Peterson Air Force Base, Colorado (includes dates of federal mobilization of 150th Group)
 Rogers, B. (2006). United States Air Force Unit Designations Since 1978.

External links 

 150th SOW Facebook Page
 150th Special Operations Wing official website
 https://web.archive.org/web/20101001022006/http://www.peopleforpearce.com/content/last-two-f-16s-depart-new-mexico%E2%80%99s-150th-fighter-wing
 On 1 December 2013, the 150th Fighter Wing became the 150th Special Operations Wing. 
 Kirtland AFB Fact Sheet
 GlobalSecurity.org
 USAFPatches.com
 Kirtland AFB Biographies-Colonel Joe A. Martinez II 

Special operations wings of the United States Air Force
Military units and formations in New Mexico